Rouse may refer to:

Places
 Rouse, California, United States, a census-designated place
 Rouse, Wisconsin, United States, an unincorporated community
 Rouses Point, New York, United States, a village
 Rouse Islands, Antarctica
 Cape Rouse, Antarctica

People
 Rouse (surname)
 Rouse Simmons (Wisconsin politician) (1832–1897), American politician and businessman

Other uses
 The Rouse, a military bugle call
 Rouse Baronets, an extinct baronetcy in the Baronetage of England
 Rouse High School, Leander, Texas, United States
 Rouse Ranch, Holt County, Nebraska, United States
 The Rouse Company, an American real estate developer

See also
 Rouse model in polymer physics
 Rouse number, a non-dimensional number in fluid dynamics
 Rouse Rocks (disambiguation)
 Rouses, a supermarket chain in Louisiana and Mississippi
 Rousse, Bulgaria
 Rowse, a surname
 Raus (disambiguation)